The Hays Mountains are a large group of mountains and peaks of the Queen Maud Mountains of Antarctica, surmounting the divide between the lower portions of Amundsen Glacier and Scott Glacier and extending from the vicinity of Mount Thorne on the northwest to Mount Dietz on the southeast. They were discovered by Rear Admiral Richard E. Byrd on the South Pole flight of November 28–29, 1929, and mapped in part by the Byrd Antarctic Expedition geological parties to this area in 1929 and 1934. They were named by Byrd for Will H. Hays, former head of the Motion Picture Producers and Distributors of America.

Key features
Mount Astor, a prominent peak in the range, was named by Byrd for Vincent Astor, of the Astor family, for his philanthropic contributions to the 1929 expedition.

Features
Geographical features include:

 Cappellari Glacier
 Cox Peaks
 Dragons Lair Névé
 Fission Wall
 Forbidden Valley
 Heinous Peak
 Koerwitz Glacier
 Mount Armstrong
 Mount Astor
 Mount Borcik
 Mount Colbert
 Mount Crockett
 Mount Dayton
 Mount Dietz
 Mount Gevers
 Mount Goodale
 Mount Griffith
 Mount Stump
 Mount Thorne
 Mount Vaughan
 Mount Walshe
 Scott Glacier
 Sledging Col
 Souchez Glacier
 Vaughan Glacier

References

Queen Maud Mountains
Mountains of the Ross Dependency
Amundsen Coast